Jail Killing refers to the murder of four Awami League leaders in prison by the planners of army officers who launched the 15 August 1975 Bangladesh coup d'état. The four were former President Syed Nazrul Islam, former prime ministers Tajuddin Ahmed and Muhammad Mansur Ali, and President of Awami League Abul Hasnat Muhammad Qamaruzzaman

Background 

President Sheikh Mujibur Rahman was killed in the 15 August 1975 Bangladesh coup d'état and the Awami League government overthrown.

History 

On 3 November 1975, Major General Khaled Mosharraf and Colonel Shafaat Jamil launched a counter coup to remove Khondaker Mostaq Ahmad and the killers of Sheikh Mujibur Rahman from power.

The military administration had placed around 50 Awami League activists including four senior Awami League leaders in Dhaka Central Jail. The four were former President Syed Nazrul Islam, former prime ministers Tajuddin Ahmed and Muhammad Mansur Ali, and President of Awami League Abul Hasnat Muhammad Qamaruzzaman. On 4 November 1975, jailer Aminur Rahman took the four from their separate rooms and placed them in one room. Aminur told them an important representative of the Khondaker Mostaq Ahmad government would meet them.

Five Army officers led by Moslemuddin were refused entry to the jail by the Deputy inspector general of prisons but were eventually allowed following the orders of President Khondaker Mostaq Ahmad. The army personnel marched into the jail and shot the four leaders in their jail cell killing all except Muhammad Mansur Ali. After hearing the groans and Muhammad Mansur Ali call for water one of the prison guards, Motaleb, went and informed the army team who had returned to the entrance of the jail. The team returned and bayoneted all four Awami League leaders in their jail cells.

Investigation 
A First Information Report was filed with Lalbagh police station about the four murders and its officer in charge ABM Fazlul Karim was tasked to investigate the incident. Deputy Superintendent of Police Saifuddin Ahmed was appointed the investigation officer but he was not allowed to visit the jail cell. From 1975 to 1995, the investigation did not proceed due to lack of interest from different governments. Investigation started after the Awami League was elected to power in 1996; the first Awami League government since 1975. The post mortem reports and police investigation files disappeared. A Judicial Commission was created to investigate the incident but failed to complete their investigation and their files disappeared at the concerned ministry. The Indemnity Ordinance, 1975 provided protection to the army officers involved in the killing. Abdul Kahar Akand of the Criminal Investigation Department was appointed investigator of the case.

On 15 October 1998, charge sheet was presented against 23 accused in the jail killing case.

Trial 
Metropolitan Sessions Judge Motiur Rahman issued an arrest warrant against Deputy Superintendent of Police Saifuddin Ahmed on 30 September 2004 after failing to appear before the court due to ill health. Bangladesh Nationalist Party member of parliament KM Obaidur Rahman described the trial as harassment. Two accused, Taheruddin Thakur and Shah Moazzem Hossain were out on bail. 

The Metropolitan Sessions Court had found 15 of the 20 accused in the case guilty. Marfot Ali Shah, Moslemuddin, and Abdul Hashem Mridha were sentenced to death. Abdul Majed, Ahmed Sharful Hossain, A.K.M. Mohiuddin Ahmed, Khandaker Abdur Rashid, Mohammad Bazlul Huda, Mohammad Kismat Hashem, Nazmul Hossain Ansar, Syed Faruque Rahman, Sultan Shahriar Rashid Khan, Shariful Haque Dalim, S.H.M.B Noor Chowdhury, and Rashed Chowdhury, were sentenced to life imprisonment. Mohamed Khairuzzaman, KM Obaidur Rahman, Shah Moazzem Hossain, Nurul Islam Manzur and Taheruddin Thakur were found innocent of all charges.

On 29 August 2008, Justice Nozrul Islam Chowdhury and Justice Md. Ataur Rahman Khan of the Bangladesh High Court issued a verdict on the appeal of the 2004 judgement. The court upheld the sentence of only Moslemuddin. The court found AKM Mohiuddin Ahmed, Abul Hashem Mridha, Bazlul Huda, Marfat Ali Shah, Syed Farook Rahman, and Sultan Shahriar Rashid Khan, were found innocent of all charges.

In 2010, Attorney General of Bangladesh, Mahbubey Alam, announced plans to appeal the High Court verdict.

In 2013 a full bench of the Bangladesh Supreme Court composed of Chief Justice Md. Muzammel Hossain, Justice Nazmun Ara Sultana, Justice Md. Abdul Wahhab Miah, Justice Surendra Kumar Sinha, Justice Syed Mahmud Hossain, and Justice Muhammad Imman Ali gave the verdict in the appeal of the jail killing case. The bench upheld the death sentences of Marfat Ali Shah and Abul Hashem Mridha which the Bangladesh High Court bench removed.

Asaduzzaman Khan, the Minister of Home Affairs, stated that the government is trying to enforce the Supreme Court verdict. The Awami League government is trying to bring back Mohamed Khairuzzaman, one of the accused in the jail killing case, from Malaysia in 2022 where he had served as the ambassador of Bangladesh. Rashed Chowdhury is in the United States and Noor Chowdhury is in Canada. Abdul Majed was detained in 2020.

Legacy 

4 November is remembered as Jail Killing Day in Bangladesh. Awami League organizes programs throughout the country to mark the day.

References 

1975 murders in Bangladesh
1975 in Bangladesh
Military coups in Bangladesh
November 1975 events in Asia
Violence in Bangladesh
Military history of Bangladesh
History of Bangladesh (1971–present)
1970s in Dhaka